Beach Haven is a borough in Ocean County, New Jersey located on Long Beach Island (LBI) and bordering the Atlantic Ocean. As of the 2010 United States Census, the borough's population was 1,170, reflecting a decline of 108 (−8.5%) from the 1,278 counted in the 2000 Census, which had in turn declined by 197 (−13.4%) from the 1,475 counted in the 1990 Census.

Beach Haven was incorporated as a Borough by an act of the New Jersey Legislature on November 11, 1890, from portions of Eagleswood Township, based on the results of a referendum held five days earlier.

History
Beach Haven, known as the "Queen City," is a late 19th-century beachfront resort originally established in 1873 to house wealthy summer residents from Philadelphia. Although some of the major structures, including several hotels and a boardwalk, were lost to storms in the 1940s including the Great Atlantic Hurricane of 1944, a large portion of the town retains its Victorian and Edwardian character. The Beach Haven Historic District listed in the New Jersey and the National Register of Historic Places in the early 1980s, encompasses the most intact buildings at the core of the resort.

The first incident in the Jersey Shore shark attacks of 1916 took place at the east end of Engleside Avenue. The ensuing series of attacks along the Jersey Shore became the basis for the book Jaws, by Peter Benchley.

Geography
According to the United States Census Bureau, the borough had a total area of 2.33 square miles (6.03 km2), including 0.98 square miles (2.54 km2) of land and 1.35 square miles (3.50 km2) of water (57.94%).

The borough borders the Ocean County municipalities of Little Egg Harbor Township and Long Beach Township.

Demographics

Census 2010

The Census Bureau's 2006–2010 American Community Survey showed that (in 2010 inflation-adjusted dollars) median household income was $71,532 (with a margin of error of +/− $4,910) and the median family income was $89,306 (+/− $12,115). Males had a median income of $54,750 (+/− $63,730) versus $51,875 (+/− $34,023) for females. The per capita income for the borough was $52,498 (+/− $9,292). About 3.8% of families and 5.8% of the population were below the poverty line, including 18.3% of those under age 18 and 1.2% of those age 65 or over.

Census 2000
As of the 2000 United States Census there were 1,278 people, 586 households, and 346 families residing in the borough. The racial makeup of the borough was 98.83% White, 0.08% African American, 0.55% Asian, 0.08% from other races, and 0.47% from two or more races. Hispanic or Latino of any race were 4.69% of the population.

There were 586 households, out of which 18.3% had children under the age of 18 living with them, 47.4% were married couples living together, 8.7% had a female householder with no husband present, and 40.8% were non-families. 35.0% of all households were made up of individuals, and 19.5% had someone living alone who was 65 years of age or older. The average household size was 2.17 and the average family size was 2.80.

In the borough, the population was spread out, with 17.1% under the age of 18, 5.1% from 18 to 24, 22.0% from 25 to 44, 28.1% from 45 to 64, and 27.7% who were 65 years of age or older. The median age was 49 years. For every 100 females, there were 87.1 males. For every 100 females age 18 and over, there were 86.4 males.

The median income for a household in the borough was $48,355, and the median income for a family was $68,036. Males had a median income of $39,444 versus $29,688 for females. The per capita income for the borough was $30,267. About 1.2% of families and 3.7% of the population were below the poverty line, including 3.3% of those under age 18 and 1.9% of those age 65 or over.

Arts and culture
The Surflight Theatre is a 450-seat theater originally established in 1950 that offers theatrical productions for adults and children. It and its sister establishment, the cabaret-style sing-for-your dessert restaurant the Showplace Ice Cream Parlour, closed in 2015 after filing for bankruptcy with $2.6 million in debt, re-opening in 2017 under new ownership.

Parks and recreation
Beach Haven is home to multiple attractions, including the only amusement park on the island: Fantasy Island, Bay Village Shopping Center, the Long Beach Island Museum and many distinctive shops and restaurants, including Tucker's Restaurant, noted in Philadelphia magazine as the number one restaurant on Long Beach Island. 

The borough offers Fantasy Island amusement park, Thundering Surf water park and numerous miniature golf facilities. Veteran's Bicentennial Park, in the heart of Beach Haven, hosts many summer concerts, flea markets and parades, and an open park area for general recreation. As the island is only a few blocks wide, the beach and the bay (Little Egg Harbor) are readily accessible from anywhere in Beach Haven. Pavilions could be found at Fifth and Pearl Streets, both of which were washed away by Hurricane Sandy in October 2012 and subsequently rebuilt in June 2013. Beach badges are required and can be purchased at Borough Hall or the Centre Street badge booth, however daily and weekly badges may be purchased via mobile app.

Government

Local government
Since 2010, Beach Haven has operated within the Faulkner Act, formally known as the Optional Municipal Charter Law, under the Council-Manager form of government. The township is one of 42 municipalities (of the 564) statewide that use this form of government. The governing body is comprised of five members, who are elected on an at-large basis in staggered non-partisan elections, with either two or three seats up for vote in even-numbered years as part of the November general election in a four-year cycle. At a reorganization meeting held each January, one member is chosen as mayor and another as council president, each serving one-year terms in that position. Beach Haven had previously been governed under the Walsh Act, by a three-member Board of Commissioners, one of whom was selected to serve as Mayor, under a system in place from 1946 to 2010.

, members of the Beach Haven Borough Council are Mayor Colleen Lambert (2024), Council President Jaime Baumiller (2022), Daniel Allen (2022), Nancy Taggart Davis (2024) and Kristina Rutherford (2024).</ref>

In the November 2014 general election incumbent James White, who had not placed his name on the ballot for re-election, won the second open council seat behind a write-in campaign that brought him 167 votes, ahead of Don Katskis, who had received a total of 165 votes.

Federal, state and county representation
Beach Haven is located in the 2nd Congressional District and is part of New Jersey's 9th state legislative district.

 

Ocean County is governed by a Board of County Commissioners comprised of five members who are elected on an at-large basis in partisan elections and serving staggered three-year terms of office, with either one or two seats coming up for election each year as part of the November general election. At an annual reorganization held in the beginning of January, the board chooses a Director and a Deputy Director from among its members. , Ocean County's Commissioners (with party affiliation, term-end year and residence) are:

Commissioner Director John P. Kelly (R, 2022, Eagleswood Township),
Commissioner Deputy Director Virginia E. Haines (R, 2022, Toms River),
Barbara Jo Crea (R, 2024, Little Egg Harbor Township)
Gary Quinn (R, 2024, Lacey Township) and
Joseph H. Vicari (R, 2023, Toms River). Constitutional officers elected on a countywide basis are 
County Clerk Scott M. Colabella (R, 2025, Barnegat Light),
Sheriff Michael G. Mastronardy (R, 2022; Toms River) and
Surrogate Jeffrey Moran (R, 2023, Beachwood).

Politics

Beach Haven has supported all Republican presidential candidates since at least 1932.

As of March 23, 2011, there were a total of 992 registered voters in Beach Haven, of which 175 (17.6%) were registered as Democrats, 346 (34.9%) were registered as Republicans and 471 (47.5%) were registered as Unaffiliated. There were no voters registered to other parties. Among the borough's 2010 Census population, 84.8% (vs. 63.2% in Ocean County) were registered to vote, including 98.3% of those ages 18 and over (vs. 82.6% countywide).

In the 2013 gubernatorial election, Republican Chris Christie received 77.9% of the vote (366 cast), ahead of Democrat Barbara Buono with 20.9% (98 votes), and other candidates with 1.3% (6 votes), among the 483 ballots cast by the borough's 967 registered voters (13 ballots were spoiled), for a turnout of 49.9%. In the 2009 gubernatorial election, Republican Chris Christie received 59.8% of the vote (333 ballots cast), ahead of Democrat Jon Corzine with 29.3% (163 votes), Independent Chris Daggett with 7.5% (42 votes) and other candidates with 0.9% (5 votes), among the 557 ballots cast by the borough's 1,033 registered voters, yielding a 53.9% turnout.

Education
The Beach Haven School District serves public school students in pre-kindergarten through sixth grade at Beach Haven Elementary School. As of the 2018–19 school year, the district, comprised of one school, had an enrollment of 55 students and 12.0 classroom teachers (on an FTE basis), for a student–teacher ratio of 4.6:1. In the 2016–17 school year, Beach Haven had the 3rd-smallest enrollment of any school district in the state, with 70 students.

For seventh through twelfth grades, public school students attend the Southern Regional School District, which serves the five municipalities in the Long Beach Island Consolidated School District (Barnegat Light, Harvey Cedars, Long Beach Township, Ship Bottom and Surf City), along with students from Beach Haven and Stafford Township, as well as the sending district of Ocean Township. Schools in the district (with 2018–19 enrollment data from the National Center for Education Statistics) are 
Southern Regional Middle School with 934 students in grades 7–8 and 
Southern Regional High School with 1,952 students in grades 9–12. Both schools are in the Manahawkin section of Stafford Township.

Transportation

Roads and highways

No Interstate, U.S. or state highways serve Beach Haven. The main road serving the borough is County Route 607 (Bay Avenue).

Public transportation
Ocean Ride provides bus service on the OC9 LBI South route between Holgate and Manahawkin / Stafford Township.

The LBI Shuttle operates along Long Beach Boulevard, providing free service every 5 to 20 minutes from 10:00 AM to 10:00 PM. It serves the Long Beach Island municipalities / communities of Barnegat Light, Loveladies, Harvey Cedars, North Beach, Surf City, Ship Bottom, Long Beach Township, Beach Haven and Holgate.

Climate
According to the Köppen climate classification system, Beach Haven, New Jersey has a humid subtropical climate (Cfa) with hot, moderately humid summers, cool winters and year-around precipitation. Cfa climates are characterized by all months having an average mean temperature > 32.0 °F (> 0.0 °C), at least four months with an average mean temperature ≥ 50.0 °F (≥ 10.0 °C), at least one month with an average mean temperature ≥ 71.6 °F (≥ 22.0 °C) and no significant precipitation difference between seasons. During the summer months in Beach Haven, a cooling afternoon sea breeze is present on most days, but episodes of extreme heat and humidity can occur with heat index values ≥ 95 °F (≥ 35 °C). During the winter months, episodes of extreme cold and wind can occur with wind chill values < 0 °F (< −18 °C). The plant hardiness zone at Beach Haven Beach is 7a with an average annual extreme minimum air temperature of 4.8 °F (−15.1 °C).

Ecology

According to the A. W. Kuchler U.S. potential natural vegetation types, Beach Haven, New Jersey would have a dominant vegetation type of Northern Cordgrass (73) with a dominant vegetation form of Coastal Prairie (20).

Notable people

People who were born in, residents of, or otherwise closely associated with Beach Haven include:

 Doc Cramer (1905–1990), center fielder who played for four American League teams
 Elizabeth Warder Crozer Campbell (1893-1971), archaeologist
 Lara Knutson (born 1974), artist and industrial designer, who was influenced by being fascinated as a child by the play of light on seashells along the beachfront in her hometown, as well as the texture they would create when crushed
 Joe Piscopo (born 1951), comedian and actor
 Henry Wisniewski (1908–1988), American football player and dentist

References

External links

 Beach Haven Borough
 Beach Haven Elementary School
 
 School Data for the Beach Haven Elementary School, National Center for Education Statistics
 Southern Regional School District

 
1890 establishments in New Jersey
Boroughs in Ocean County, New Jersey
Faulkner Act (council–manager)
Jersey Shore communities in Ocean County
Long Beach Island
Populated places established in 1890